Reux is a commune in the Calvados department in the Normandy region in northwestern France.

It is the location of the Château de Reux, a Rothschild family residence.

Population

See also
Communes of the Calvados department

References

External links

 Official website (French language)

Communes of Calvados (department)
Calvados communes articles needing translation from French Wikipedia